Sloboda-Bushanska is an urban-type settlement in Vinnytsia Oblast, Ukraine located at 48°21N 28°05E. 
It is located in the Mohyliv-Podilskyi Raion, located adjacent to the Dniester river it is generally cold and temperate. In Sloboda-Bushanska the average temperature is 9.0 °C and average annual rainfall is 592mm. although June and July are the warmest and wettest months.
It is also the site of a small power station.

References

Urban-type settlements in Mohyliv-Podilskyi Raion